The women's lead competition in sport climbing at the 2009 World Games took place on 19 July at the Shoushan Junior High School in Kaohsiung, Taiwan.

Competition format
A total of 11 athletes entered the competition. Best eight athletes from preliminary advances to the semifinal. Best six athletes from this stage advances to the final.

Results

Preliminary round

Semifinal

Final

References